Aponia insularis is a moth in the family Crambidae. It was described by Eugene G. Munroe in 1964. It is found in Cuba.

References

Moths described in 1964
Pyraustinae
Moths of the Caribbean
Endemic fauna of Cuba